Jacob Christiaan "Jaap" ten Kortenaar  (born 31 January 1964) is a cyclist from the Netherlands. He competed in the men's team time trial at the 1992 Summer Olympics, finishing 9th. He finished second and third at the Dutch National Time Trial Championships in respectively 1993 and 1994.

Jaap is the brother of speed skater Marnix ten Kortenaar.

See also
 List of Dutch Olympic cyclists

References

1964 births
Living people
Dutch male cyclists
Olympic cyclists of the Netherlands
Cyclists at the 1992 Summer Olympics
People from Zoetermeer
Sportspeople from South Holland